Camille Paule (1 March 1867 in Pesmes – 22 September 1946 in Champagney) was the husband of Salima Machamba, sultan (queen) of Mohéli (Mwali) (1901–1909). He was a French gendarme.

Life
He was born on 1 March 1867 in Pesmes. He was a French gendarme in Saint Denis, Réunion where Salima Machamba, sultan (queen) of Mohéli (Mwali) resided, and she fell in love with and on 28 August 1901 married him, in Saint Denis, Réunion. In 1909 his wife was deposed by the French government and Comoros was annexed by France. The queen was deported with her family to France. Her wife gave birth to three children. The French government provided his wife a yearly allowance of 3,000 gold Francs. They lived as simple farmers in Haute-Saône, and he died in Champagney on 22 September 1946.

Children 
 From her marriage to Salima Machamba (1874–1964), sultan (queen) of Mohéli (Mwali), three children:
 Henriette Camille Ursule Louise (Cléry, Côte-d'Or, 15 July 1902 − Dijon, Côte-d'Or, 4 April 1989), Princess of Mohéli, she has a daughter:
 Christiane
 Louis Camille (Cléry, Côte-d'Or, 1 September 1907 − Dole, Jura, 8 April 1983), Prince of Mohéli, he has a daughter:
 Anne Ursule (1941– ), President of Association Développement des Iles Comores, wife of Jean–François Etter
 Camille Fernand (Cléry, Côte-d'Or, 16 June 1917 − Dijon, 1 April 2007), Prince of Mohéli

Notes

Bibliography
 Nivois, Julienne: A Pesmes, en Franche-Comté..., Une Reine oubliée par l'Histoire, Éditions Dominique Guéniot, Paris, 1995.

External links

 Comores/Ursule Salima Machamba 1ère, Dernière reine de Mohéli (Access date: 11 April 2015)
 Habari Za Komori/Ursule Salima Machamba 1ère, Dernière reine de Mohéli (Access date: 11 April 2015)
 Rulers/Salima Machamba (Access date: 11 April 2015)

1867 births
1946 deaths
History of the Comoros
People from Mohéli
19th-century French people
20th-century French people
People from Haute-Saône
Officers of the National Gendarmerie